Buku Harian Seorang Istri is an Indonesian television drama series produced by David Suwarto which premiered on 12 January 2021 on SCTV. It starred Zoe Abbas Jackson, Cinta Brian, and Antonio Blanco Jr.

The show have a timeslot change from 9.25 pm to 2.00 pm to pave the way for a new show Lara Ati from 19 August 2022. The series went off air on 4 September 2022 and the show was replaced by Takdir Cinta yang Kupilih from 5 September 2022.

Plot 
Nana (Zoe Abbas Jackson) is forced to marry Dewa Buwana (Cinta Brian) at the request of Wawan (Umar Lubis), his father.

However, their marriage did not go as smoothly as Nana had hoped. Dewa was forced to comply with Wawan's wish because he did not want to be imprisoned for hitting Wawan. Nana's daily life is a tormented married life without any love between the two of them. While Dewa, who had loved Alya (Hana Saraswati) from the start and was planning to get married but was blocked by his mother's blessing, Farah (Dian Nitami) finally remained in a relationship with Alya.

Cast 
Zoe Abbas Jackson as Nana Juniarto
Cinta Brian as Dewa Buwana
Antonio Blanco Jr as Adhi Buwana/Pasha
Rangga Azof as Fajar Juniarto
Hana Saraswati as Alya Wijaya Kusuma
Asha Assuncao as Livia Buwana
Mahdy Reza as Roni
Aqeela Calista as Amira
Ochi Rosdiana as Friska
Sarah Samantha as Nurani Senja
Rina Hasyim as Ratu Buwana
Meriam Bellina as Merlin Buwana
Ingrid Kansil as Saskia
Dian Nitami as Farah Buwana
Kevin Kambey as Kevin Argantha/Willson Aksana
Ika Purpitasari as Ika Argantha
Claresta Taufan as Dewi
Rita Hamzah as Suketi
Teuku Ryan as Naufal Aksana
Vira Yuniar as Saras
Saskia Chadwick as Saskia
Rassya Hidayah as Chiko
Jajang C. Noer as Widya
Emir Pahlevi as Toni
Nando Helmy as Lucky
Djihan Ranti as Jihan
Riska Bunga Fahira as Neta
Fitria Salwa Anggraini as Junior Buwana/Alvin Buwana
Fendy Pradana as Alfonso
Joseph Hungan as George Hungan
Callista Arum as Lula Juniarto
Haico Van der Veken as Cornelia 
Umar Lubis as Wawan Juniarto
Adjie Pangestu as Rama Buwana
Hanna Hasyim as Nawang
Ine Dewi as Prasasty Sari
Firzanah Alya as Salsa
Ananda Faturrahman as Diana
 Adipura Prabahaswara as Arman Adhitama
Ise Irish Hutasoit as Claudia Sabrina / Clara Sabrina
Indah Indriana as Ani
Elma Agustin as Putri
Zack Lee as Zacky
Yadi Timo as Marwan
Henny Timbul as Inem 
Fadil Joan as Fadly
Nabila Zavira as Elma
Argio Cetta Early as Gio
El Rumi as Reza
Tyas Wahono as Benni
Maura Gabrielle as Dina
Vina Adam as Naura Hungan
Tsania Marwa as Lady
Ratu Zahra as Mia
Siva Aprilia as Lita Aprilia
Macho Virgonta as Rico
Kayla Nur Syahwa as Fitri
Ida Bagus Gde Aditya Restha Pratama as Hendry
Hengky Tornando as Arief Wicaksono
Luz Victoria as Mirna
Marissa Zhifania Azzahira as Nanda
Roy Marten as GM
Eva Anindita as Eva
Feby Fristya as Anya
Hessel Steven as Hessel: Naufal's office assistant
Rey Bong as Singer Rey

Special appearance
Virgoun Tambunan as Virgoun
Melly Goeslaw as Melly Goeslaw
Audy Item as Audy
Anto Hoed as Anto Hoed

Soundtrack

Controversy

IBC give first warning  
Indonesian Broadcasting Commission (IBC) imposed an administrative sanction of written warning on 30 January 2021 because it was a scene of a man and a woman on a bed in a position overlapping each other and eye contact.

IBC give a second warning 
Indonesian Broadcasting Commission (IBC) imposed an administrative sanction of written warning on 10 March 2021 because there is an inner monologue of a woman who is deemed unfit to be broadcast related to sexual relations outside marriage.

Productions

Casting 
In June 2021, Ahmad El Jalaluddin Rumi entered the show as Reza. In October 2021, Rangga Azof was roped in to play Fajar Juniarto. In the same month, Haico Van der Veken to play the role of Cornelia. In May 2022, Haico Van der Veken quit the show. In June 2022, Rey Bong to join as a cameo, Singer Rey Bong. In the same month, Aqeela Calista joined the cast as Amira.

References

External links 
 

Indonesian drama television series
Indonesian television soap operas